Alada (Arba) is a Gbe language of Nigeria and Benin that has proven difficult to classify. Ethnologue counts Alada and Tɔli as dialects of Gun, but Capo (1988) considers it one of the Phla–Pherá languages. Kluge (2000) found elements of both Fon–Gun and Phla–Pherá.

References 

Gbe languages
Languages of Nigeria
Languages of Benin